Crystal Lake, Wisconsin may refer to:
Crystal Lake, Barron County, Wisconsin, a town
Crystal Lake, Marquette County, Wisconsin, a town
Crystal Lake (Vilas County, Wisconsin), a lake